King's Highway 31, commonly referred to as Highway 31 and historically known as the Metcalfe Road, was a provincially maintained highway in the Canadian province of Ontario. The  route connected Highway 2 in Morrisburg with the Chaudière Bridge at the Ontario–Quebec boundary in downtown Ottawa.

Established in 1927, Highway31 originally extended from Highway2 north to the Stormont, Dundas and Glengarry – Carleton county line. It was extended into Ottawa in 1936, and had several routings through the city over the years. The southern terminus was altered with the construction of the St. Lawrence Seaway in 1958, and a bypass of Winchester was opened in 1974. The entire highway was decommissioned in 1997 and 1998, and transferred to lower levels of government. It has since been known as Stormont, Dundas and Glengarry (SDG) County Road31 outside of Ottawa, and Ottawa Road31 and several local names within Ottawa, notably Bank Street and Bronson Avenue.

Route description 

It travelled in a north–northwest direction across eastern Ontario, servicing the communities of Morrisburg, Williamsburg and Winchester, as well as travelling into downtown Ottawa via Gloucester.
Since then, it has been known as Stormont, Dundas and Glengarry (SDG) County Road31 and Ottawa Road31.

Today, this intersection is now a roundabout.
It travelled northerly, passing over the CN Kingston Subdivision next to Morrisburg Station,
a former Via Rail stop that was closed in 2021.
The route crossed Highway 401 at an interchange (Exit750) and proceeded to be surrounded by farmland.
It travels through the community of Glen Becker, Williamsburg and The Sixth as it crosses the municipality of South Dundas. The route then enters the municipality of North Dundas at Winchester Springs, near which it crosses several creeks and irrigation drains. It passes through the community of Cass Bridge, providing access to the conservation area of the same name, before encountering the eastern leg of former Highway43.

Highway31 and Highway43 travelled concurrently as they bypassed southwest of Winchester, crossing over the CP Rail Winchester subdivision along the way. To the west of the village, the two routes parted ways, and Highway31 continued north. It passed through the community of Cloverdale, then swerved west to avoid the community of Harmony before entering what was then known as the Regional Municipality of Ottawa–Carleton at Marionville Road. Within the former Osgoode Township the highway bisected the village of Vernon and the community of Spring Hill before beginning to meander northeast. It crossed the North Castor River at Greely, then entered the city of Gloucester at Regional Road8 (Mitch Owens Road).

Within Gloucester, Highway31 travelled straight north-northeast through the community of Leitrim before once again meandering northeast. It entered the bedroom community of Blossom Park before crossing into the city of Ottawa at Regional Road32 (Hunt Club Road). Within Ottawa, Highway31 continued as a Connecting Link, following Bank Street through the South Keys neighbourhood and crossing CN's Walkely Line into the Heron Gate neighbourhood. It turned west onto Regional Road16 (Heron Road). It turned north onto the Airport Parkway, which becomes Bronson Avenue upon crossing the Rideau River. Highway31 followed Bronson Avenue, meeting an interchange with Highway417 (the Queensway), and turning southwest onto Albert Street. It then turned north onto Booth Street and ended at the Ontario–Quebec boundary on the Chaudière Bridge over the Ottawa River, where it continued as Eddy Street into Hull.

History

Assumption and paving 
Highway31 was first established as a provincial highway on July2, 1927, when  of roads were assumed by the Department of Public Highways within the townships of Williamsburgh, Winchester and Mountain.
The highway inexplicably ended at the Dundas–Carleton county boundary south of Vernon for the next decade.

While the Metcalfe Road was already fully paved by the time Highway31 was established, the portion of the route assumed in 1927 was unpaved in its entirety.
This was followed in 1934 with another  of paving south from Winchester. The final 7.25-kilometre gap north of Williamsburg was paved in 1936.

Realignments and route changes 

While the southern terminus of Highway31 was always at Highway2, the construction of the St. Lawrence Seaway in the late-1950s resulted in a substantial alteration to the route of the latter. Highway2 originally followed what is now Lakeshore Drive, which was inundated in July 1958 by the rising waters of the seaway east of Morrisburg.
Highway2 was rerouted along the former CN railway right-of-way (itself moved further inland) prior to the flooding, with the new alignment opening to traffic in May 1958.

Originally, Highway31 entered into Winchester along St. Lawrence Street before turning west onto Main Street.
As early as 1965, proposals for bypassing the village were raised.
After lengthy delays over whether or not to cross a Canadian Pacific Railway line at-grade, among other issues, construction began on the bypass in 1972.
Highway31 and Highway43 were rerouted on to the Winchester Bypass when it was opened on July30, 1974.

Within Ottawa
When Highway31 was extended to Ottawa in 1937, provincial jurisdiction ended at Billings Bridge, where Bank Street crossed the Rideau River and entered the city limits.
The portion with Ottawa, which was maintained and signed under a Connecting Link agreement with the provincial government, initially followed Bank Street directly to the foot of Parliament Hill at Wellington Street. It became concurrent with Highways 17/15/16 north of Carling Avenue (renamed Glebe Avenue in 1974),
and a secondary route of all four highways also followed Rideau Canal Drive (now the Queen Elizabeth Driveway) between Carling Avenue and Wellington Street via Elgin Street.
The 1955 Ontario Road map shows a new routing through Ottawa for the first time, with all four concurrent highways turning east onto Rideau Canal Drive off Bank Street on the north side of the Rideau Canal. The 1956 edition of the map continues to show Highway31 also following Bank Street to Wellington Street in addition to the portion along Rideau Canal Drive.
In the 1960 edition, both routes were removed and Highway31 was rerouted along Heron Road and Bronson Avenue to end at Highway17 at Carling Avenue.
This was altered in the 1964 edition, as Highway17 was moved onto the partially-completed Queensway; Highway31 and 16 now continued from Carling Avenue north to the Bronson Avenue interchange (now Exit121A).
It is unclear when Highway31 was signed north of the Queensway to the Quebec boundary, but it is shown as the northern terminus in the 1989 Highways Distance Tables.

Downloading 
As part of a series of budget cuts initiated by premier Mike Harris under his Common Sense Revolution platform in 1995, numerous highways deemed to no longer be of significance to the provincial network were decommissioned and responsibility for the routes transferred to a lower level of government, a process referred to as downloading. Due to its proximity to Highway16, which was in the process of being upgraded to Highway 416, the entirety of Highway31 was downloaded in 1997 and 1998. On April1, 1997,  of the route, from Regional Road8 (Mitch Owens Road) to the Ottawa city limits south of Regional Road32 (Hunt Club Road), was transferred to the Regional Municipality of Ottawa–Carleton.

Major intersections

References

External links 

 Highway 31 pictures and information

031